Meegan Rooney (born 18 February 1984) is an Australian netball player. Rooney played for the Queensland Firebirds in the Commonwealth Bank Trophy (2003, 2005–07) and in the ANZ Championship (2008).

References
2008 Queensland Firebirds profile. Retrieved on 2008-05-07.
Queensland Firebirds past players. Retrieved on 2009-03-28.
2006 Queensland Firebirds team profile. ABC Sport. Retrieved on 2009-03-28.

1984 births
Living people
Australian netball players
Queensland Firebirds players
ANZ Championship players
Commonwealth Bank Trophy players
Queensland Fusion players
Australian Netball League players